Joseph Bower (dates of birth and death unknown) was an English cricketer. Bower was a fast-medium bowler, although which arm he used to bowl with is unknown.

Bower made his first-class debut for Hampshire in 1897 against Cambridge University, with Bower taking three wickets for 55 runs on debut. Bower made one more first-class appearance for Hampshire in 1897, against the touring Gentlemen of Philadelphia. Bower scored five runs in Hampshire's first innings before being bowled by Bart King. In the Gentlemen of Philadelphia second innings Bower took his career best bowling figures of 4/43.

In 1898 Bower made his County Championship debut Lancashire, in what was to be his final first-class appearance. In three first-class matches for Hampshire, Bower took eight wickets at an average of 20.75.

External links
Joseph Bower at Cricinfo
Joseph Bower at CricketArchive

English cricketers
Hampshire cricketers